Callos a la Madrileña is a stewed tripe dish, cooked slowly for hours over low heat, that is a speciality of Spanish cuisine associated with the city of Madrid. Traditionally pig or cow tripe was used but modern recipes use lamb or even cod. It includes pig snout and trotters, black pudding, sausage, ham,  and soup vegetables like carrots and onions. When prepared correctly the broth is rich in gelatin and the tripe becomes very tender after the slow cooking process. The tripe can be browned before the cooking liquid is added, with trotter's, oxtails and other ingredients for the soup like ham, chorizo and smoked paprika. It is common to serve this stew with the morcilla blood sausage, a tapas dish typical of the region of Castile and León.

A version of the stew with chickpeas is made in the Philippines.

See also 
 Menudo (soup)
 Sopa de mondongo
 Tripes à la mode de Caen
 Flaki
 İşkembe çorbası

References

Spanish cuisine
Culture in Madrid
Meat stews
Pig's trotters
Offal
Philippine stews